Zbigniew Tymiński (born 19 August 1955) has worked as a coach for Lechia Gdańsk, working as the teams assistant manager between 1990-93 and 1997-98, and was the Lechia first team manager in 1993.

References

1955 births
Polish football managers
Lechia Gdańsk players
Lechia Gdańsk managers
Living people
Polish footballers
Association footballers not categorized by position